165th meridian may refer to:

165th meridian east, a line of longitude east of the Greenwich Meridian
165th meridian west, a line of longitude west of the Greenwich Meridian